Pēteris Vasks (born 16 April 1946) is a Latvian composer.

Biography
Vasks was born in Aizpute, Latvia, into the family of a Baptist pastor. He trained as a violinist at the Jāzeps Vītols Latvian Academy of Music, as a double-bass player with Vitautas Sereikaan at the Lithuanian Academy of Music and Theatre, and played in several Latvian orchestras before entering the State Conservatory in Vilnius in the neighboring Lithuania to study composition with Valentin Utkin, as he was prevented from doing this in Latvia due to Soviet repressive policy toward Baptists. He started to become known outside Latvia in the 1990s, when Gidon Kremer started championing his works and now is one of the most influential and praised European contemporary composers.

Vasks' early style owed much to the aleatoric experiments of Witold Lutosławski, Krzysztof Penderecki and George Crumb. Later works included elements of Latvian folk music, such as his gentle and pastoral cor anglais concerto (1989). His works are generally extremely clear and communicative, with a solid and muscular sense of harmony. Lyrical passages may be followed by agitated dissonances, or interrupted by sombre sections with a march-like feel. He made extensive use of minimalist techniques as well, but never became attached to any particular method.

Vasks feels strongly about environmental issues, and a sense of nature both pristine and destroyed can be found in many of his works, such as the String Quartet No. 2 (1984). Other important works include Cantabile (1979) and Musica dolorosa (1984) and "Bass Trip" (2003) for solo double bass. He has written six string quartets, the fourth (1999) and fifth (2004) of which were written for the Kronos Quartet.

Vasks was the recipient of the Vienna Herder Prize of the Alfred Toepfer Foundation in 1996, as well as the Baltic Assembly Prize for Literature, the Arts and Science, and the Latvian Grand Music Award in 1997, the latter for his violin concerto Tālā Gaisma ("Distant Light") (1996-7). He received the Cannes Classical Awards in 2004. His important works also include "Viatore", Symphony No. 2 and "Music for a deceased Friend".

Since 1994 he has been an honorary member of the Latvian Academy of Sciences and in 2001 he became a member of the Royal Swedish Academy of Music. In 1996 he was the main composer at the Stockholm New Music Festival and in 2006 composer-in-residence at the Presteigne Festival of Music and the Arts and the Vale of Glamorgan Festival in Wales.

In 2005 he received the Estonian honour the Order of the White Star, 3rd Class.

Works
The following is a list of works by Vasks.

Symphonies
Symphony No. 1: Balsis ('Voices') (1991), for string orchestra
Symphony No. 2 (1998)
Symphony No. 3 (2005)

Other orchestral works
Cantabile per archi (1979), for string orchestra
Vēstījums ('The Message') (1982), for orchestra with percussion and two pianos
Musical dolorosa (1983), for string orchestra
Lauda (1986), for orchestra
Musica adventus (1996), for string orchestra
Adagio (1996), for string orchestra
Viatore (2001), for string orchestra (also for organ (2001))
Musica appassionata (2002), for string orchestra
Symphonic elegy Sala ('Island') (2006), for orchestra
Credo (2009), for orchestra
Epifānija ('Epiphany') (2010), for string orchestra
Musica serena (2015), for string orchestra

Orchestra with instrumental soloists
Violin concerto Tālā gaisma ('Distant Light') (1997), for violin and strings
Viola concerto (2015), for viola and strings
Cello concerto No. 1 (1994)
Cello concerto No. 2 Klātbūtne ('Presence') (2012), for cello and strings
Flute concerto (2008)
Oboe concerto (2018)
Concerto for cors anglais and orchestra (1989)

Meditation Vientuļais eņģelis ('Lonely Angel') (1999), for violin and strings
Fantasia Vox Amoris (2009), for violin and strings

Chamber music

Vasaras dejas ('Summer dances') (2017), for two violins
Castillo Interor (2013), for violin and cello
Mazā vasaras mūzika ('Little Summer Music') (1985), for violin and piano; (2012), for viola and piano
Partita (1974), for cello and piano
Three compositions (1973), for clarinet and piano
Musique du soir/Vakara mūzika ('Evening Music') (1988/1989), for horn and organ
Music for two pianos (1974)
In Memoriam (1977), for two pianos
Toccata (1977), for two pianos
Concerto for timpani and percussion (1979)

Trīs skatieni/Trīsvienība ('Three glances'/'Trinity') (1979), for violin, cello, and piano
Episodi e canto perpetuo (1985), for violin, cello, and piano
Pianotrio Plainscapes (2011), for violin, cello, and piano

Piano quartet (2001), for piano, viola, cello, and piano
String quartet nr. 1 (1977)
String quartet nr. 2 Vasaras dziedājumi ('Summer tunes') (1984)
String quartet nr. 3 Ziemassvētku kvartets ('Christmas Quartet') (1995)
String quartet nr. 4 (2000)
String quartet nr. 5 (2004)
String quartet nr. 6 (2020)

Mūzika aizlidojošajiem putniem ('Music for flying birds') (1977), for wind quintet
Mūzika aizgājušam draugam ('Music for a late friend') (1982), for wind quintet

Chamber Music (1975), for flute, oboe, clarinet, bassoon, and percussion
Pavasara sonāte ('Spring Sonata') (1987), for string sextet

Canto di forza (2005), for twelve cellos (also for organ (2006))

Solo instrumental

Cycle (1976), for piano
Moments musicaux (1977), for clarinet
Grāmata čellam ('A book for cello') (1978), for cello
Eine kleine Nachtmusik ('A Little Night Music') (1978), for piano
Ainava ar putniem ('Landscape with birds') (1980), for flute
Cantata (1980), for harpsichord
Baltā ainava ('White landscape') (1980), for piano
Rudens mūzika ('Autumn Music') (1981), for piano
Pieskārieni ('Touches') (1982), for oboe
Cantus ad pacem (Concerto per organo) (1984), for organ
Sonata (1986), for double bass
Musica sera per organo (1988), for organ
Sonata Vientulība ('Loneliness') (1990), for guitar
Te Deum (1991), for organ
Sonata (1992), for flute
Izdegušās zemes ainavas ('Landscapes of the burnt-out earth') (1992), fantasy for piano
Pavasara mūzika (Quasi una sonata) ('Spring Music' (Quasi una sonata)') (1995), for piano
Viatore (2001), for organ (also for string orchestra (2001))
Bass Trip (2003), for double bass
Canto di forza (2006), for organ (also for twelve cellos (2005))
Zaļā ainava ('Green landscape') (2008), for piano
Vasaras vakara mūzika ('Music for a summer evening') (2009), for piano
Latviešu deja ('Latvian Dance') (2012), for piano
Hymnus (2018), for organ
Dzeguzes balss. Pavasara elēģija ('Cuckoo's Voice. Spring Elegy') (2021), for paino
Sonata Estiva (2022), for violin

Choral
Unaccompanied choir:

Golgātas krusts ('Cross of Golgotha') (1967)
Ugunssargs ('The Firefighter') (1975)
Liepa ('The Lime-Tree') (1975/2012)
Māte saule ('Mother Sun') (1975)
Small concert for voices, conductor, and composer (1976)
Ar laiku puķes vīst ('Flowers wither in time') (1976)
Mūsu māšu vārdi ('Our mothers' names') (1977/2006)
Ne tikai lirika ('Not just poetry') (1977)
Baltais fragments ('White fragment') (1978)
Vasara ('Summer') (1978)
Concerto vocale (1978)
Klusās dziesmas ('Silent Songs') (1979)
Skumjā māte ('Sad Mother') (1980)
Ganu dziesma ('Shepherd's Song') (1981)
Zīles ziņa ('Message of a Chickadee') (1981)
Ķekatu dziesma ('Carnival Song') (1981)
Mazi silti svētki ('A Moment of Celebration') (1988)
Mūsu dziesma ('Our Song') (1988)
Zemgale (1989)
Varonis ('Hero') (1989)
Savā tautā ('By His People') (1990)
Pater Noster (1991) (also for choir and string orchestra (2000))
Litene (1993)
Three poems (1995), for four soloists
Balsis klusumā ('Voices in silence') (1997), for six solo voices and female choir
Mass (2000) (also for choir and organ or string orchestra (2001/2005))
Piedzimšana ('Birth') (2008)
Mīlas dziesmas ('Love Songs') (2013)
Klusuma auglis ('The Fruit of Silence') (2013) (also for choir and string orchestra (2014))
Mūsu kalni ('Our Mountains') (2017)
Tēvu zeme ('Fatherland') (2018)
Cosa devo fare? ('What should I do?') (2018)

Accompanied choir:

Lūgšana mātei ('Prayer for a mother') (1978), for soprano, choir, and orchestra
Kantāte sievietēm ('Cantata for Women') (1978), for soprano, choir, and orchestra
Three folk song settings (1984), for voices, flute, cello, and piano
Chamber cantata Latvija (1987), for soprano, flute, bells, and piano
Pater Noster (2000), for choir and string orchestra (also for unaccompanied choir (1991))
Dona Nobis Pacem (1996), for choir and organ or string orchestra
Mass (2001/2005), for choir and organ or string orchestra (also for unaccompanied choir (2000))
Līdzenuma ainavas ('Plainscapes') (2002), for choir, violin, and cello
Klusuma auglis ('The Fruit of Silence') (2014), for choir and string orchestra (also for unaccompanied choir (2013))
Lūgšana Latvijai ('Prayer for Latvia') (2014), for choir and wind orchestra
Da Pacem, Domine (2016), for choir and string orchestra
Laudate Dominum (2016), for choir and orchestra
Veni Domine (2018), for choir and organ

References

External links
 Profile at Schott Music website
 Latvian Web Page on Vasks in English
 Ondine Records: Peteris Vasks
 orfile on Music.lv website
 Liner notes for Pater Noster performed by Latvian Radio Choir
 "Peteris Vasks: Composer and Sinfonietta Riga deplore destruction" Kokafi article
 Composer Profile/Works at Schott Music (English version)
 CD Recording of String Quartets 1-5

1946 births
Living people
People from Aizpute
20th-century classical composers
21st-century classical composers
Latvian composers
Postminimalist composers
Members of the Royal Swedish Academy of Music
Lithuanian Academy of Music and Theatre alumni
Male classical composers
Herder Prize recipients
Recipients of the Order of the White Star, 3rd Class
20th-century male musicians
21st-century male musicians